Berberis farinosa is a species of plant in the family Berberidaceae. It is endemic to Ecuador.  Its natural habitat is subtropical or tropical high-altitude grassland. It is threatened by habitat loss.

References

Flora of Ecuador
farinosa
Data deficient plants
Taxonomy articles created by Polbot